Daniel Christopher Fleeman (born 3 October 1982) is an English former racing cyclist, who rode as a professional between 2007 and 2011. He competed in the Under-23 road race at the 2004 UCI Road World Championships in Verona, Italy. He first retired after the 2011 season.

After retiring from road racing Fleeman competed as an Elite mountain bike rider in the national XC series, riding in 2012 as an independent whilst developing his coaching business Dig Deep Coaching, and establishing his own team, Dig Deep Coaching-Pactimo-Cannondale, for 2013.  Fleeman returned to the roads in 2014, and subsequently joined Metaltek Kuota, winning the Rutland – Melton International CiCLE Classic in 2017.

Major results

2004
 1st  Road race, National Under-23 Road Championships
2005
 1st Prix De La St Amour
 1st Stage 3 Tour du Beaujolais
2008
 1st  Overall Tour des Pyrénées
 7th Overall Tour of Britain
 10th Overall Vuelta a Extremadura
1st Stage 1 (TTT)
2009
 1st  National Hill Climb Championships
2010
 1st  National Hill Climb Championships
 7th Overall Tour des Pyrénées
 7th East Midlands International CiCLE Classic
2011
 3rd Richmond Grand Prix
 3rd Ryedale Grand Prix
 8th Overall Tour de Beauce
 10th East Yorkshire Classic
2014
 1st  Marathon cross-country, National Mountain Bike Championships
 8th Beaumont Trophy
2015
 7th Ryedale Grand Prix
2016
 3rd Evesham Vale Road Race
 7th Ryedale Grand Prix
 9th Rutland–Melton International CiCLE Classic
2017
 1st Rutland–Melton International CiCLE Classic

References

External links
Website

 Dan Fleeman Rider Profile – Cycling Weekly
YouTube Dan Fleeman interview with sponsors Neovite colostrum

English male cyclists
1982 births
Living people
People from Yoxall